The 9999th Air Reserve Squadron is an inactive United States Air Force Reserve squadron in Washington, DC. It often consisted of many high-ranking officers and air force reservists who were also serving in the United States Congress. Senator Barry Goldwater as a major general in the reserves once commanded the unit.

History
The unit was formed in January 1961. In 1965, the unit had 54 members of the House of Representatives and the Senate and their staffs. The unit met for duty at the Senate Office Building.

References

MAJCOM squadrons of the United States Air Force
Military units and formations of the United States Air Force Reserves
20th-century history of the United States Air Force
Civil–military relations
History of the United States Congress